The Side Show of Life is a 1924 American silent drama film produced by Famous Players-Lasky, directed by Herbert Brenon and distributed by Paramount Pictures. The film is based on the 1920 novel The Mountebank by William J. Locke, which had been turned into a play by Ernest Denny.

Cast

Production
Ernest Torrence stars in the role of a clown during World War I which is similar to that of Lon Chaney's in He Who Gets Slapped, released that same year, and in Laugh, Clown, Laugh, released four years later. Norman Trevor starred in the Broadway play in 1923.

Preservation
A print of The Side Show of Life survives in the Gosfilmofond archive, Moscow.

References

External links

Original lobby poster The Side Show of Life
Lobby poster
Glass slide; coming attraction

1924 films
1924 drama films
American black-and-white films
Silent American drama films
American silent feature films
Circus films
Films about clowns
Films based on British novels
Films directed by Herbert Brenon
Paramount Pictures films
1920s American films